Plamen Venelinov Nikolov (born 12 June 1985) is a Bulgarian former professional footballer who played as a defender.

Career

Spartak Pleven
Nikolov was born in Pleven. After emerging through Levski Sofia's youth system, he made his professional debut in the second level with Spartak Pleven, the club from his home town. He made his team début on 7 August 2004, in an 0–0 draw against Rilski Sportist Samokov. On 6 October 2004 Nikolov scored his first goal in a 6–0 drubbing of amateur side Botev Lukovit of Bulgarian Cup.

Plamen quickly became part of the main team and for two seasons earned 53 appearances, scoring two goals.

Litex Lovech
In June 2006, Nikolov agreed a deal to sign for Litex Lovech for an undisclosed fee. He has made his debut for Litex in Rilski Sportist  match on 13 August 2006 as an 85th-minute substitute. During his first season in Litex, Nikolov found regular starting positions in defence hard to find. He played only 5 matches in the domestic league.

In 2007–08 A PFG season coach of Litex Miodrag Ješić decided to put Nikolov into the starting line-up as center back. In this season, he earned 22 appearances playing in the A PFG, scored one goal. In the Bulgarian Cup, he played three matches, and in the UEFA Cup, he played 6 matches. Nikolov also won his first trophy in his career - the Bulgarian Cup. In the final against Cherno More he played 90 minutes.

In the 2008-09 season Nikolov won Bulgarian Cup for the second time.
On 25 October 2010, he was sent off in the 2:1 home win against Levski Sofia after an altercation with Darko Tasevski.

FC Tom Tomsk
In February 2012 Nikolov signed for FC Tom Tomsk on loan until the end of the season, before joining the club permanently in the summer of the same year.

Return to Litex Lovech
In January 2014 Nikolov re-signed for Litex Lovech.

Botev Plovdiv
On 30 July 2014 Plamen Nikolov signed a contract with Botev Plovdiv until the end of the season. Four days later he made a debut for the club during the 2:1 win over Cherno More Varna.

Nikolov quickly became a key player for Botev Plovdiv and took part in a lot of important games, including the 0-2 away win over the local rivals Lokomotiv Plovdiv. On 16 May, Nikolov was sent off with a direct red card after a conflict with Toni Silva from CSKA Sofia, who was also sent off. Despite his absence in the final 35 minutes Botev won the game with 3-2.

On 17 June, Nikolov extended his contract with Botev until the end of 2015–16 season.

Nikolov terminated his contract on mutual agreement and left Botev Plovdiv in January 2016.

Lokomotiv Plovdiv
On 10 July 2017, Nikolov signed with Lokomotiv Plovdiv.

Career statistics

Honours
Litex Lovech
 Bulgarian A Group (2): 2009–10, 2010–11
 Bulgarian Supercup: 2010
 Bulgarian Cup (2): 2007–08, 2008–09

References

External links
Profile at pfclitex.com 

1985 births
Living people
Bulgarian expatriate footballers
Bulgarian footballers
Bulgaria international footballers
First Professional Football League (Bulgaria) players
PFC Spartak Pleven players
PFC Litex Lovech players
FC Tom Tomsk players
Botev Plovdiv players
PFC Cherno More Varna players
PFC Lokomotiv Plovdiv players
Bulgarian expatriate sportspeople in Russia
Expatriate footballers in Russia
Association football defenders
Russian Premier League players
Sportspeople from Pleven